The Bolshoye Toko is a lake in Sakha, Russia. Its outflow is the Mulam river,  part the Uchur River basin. The lake is located in the Aldan Highlands, on the border of Sakha Republic and Khabarovsk Krai. River Utuk flows into the lake from the Toko-Stanovik subrange of the Stanovoy Highlands. It is the deepest lake in Yakutia.

See also
List of lakes of Russia

References

External links 
 Article in the Great Soviet Encyclopedia

Lakes of the Sakha Republic
Aldan Highlands